Cheating the Public is a 1918 American silent drama film directed by Richard Stanton and starring Enid Markey, Ralph Lewis and Bertram Grassby.

Cast
 Enid Markey as Mary Garvin 
 Ralph Lewis as John Dowling 
 Bertram Grassby as Chester Dowling 
 Tom Wilson as 'Bull' Thompson 
 Edward Peil Sr. as Mary's Attorney 
 Charles Edler as Martin 
 Wanda Hawley as Grace Martin 
 Carrie Clark Ward as Mrs. O'Toole 
 Fanny Midgley as Mary's Mother 
 Frankie Lee as Frankie Garvin 
 Barbara Conley as Bobby 
 James Titus as The Judge 
 Henry Peal as The District Attorney 
 Joseph Hartley as The Twelfth Juror 
 James Morgan as Warden 
 Arthur Glynn as The Governor 
 James P. McNeill as Dowling's Butler
 Arthur Shilling as Dowling's Secretary 
 Fritz von Hardenberg as Factory Inspector

References

Bibliography
 Solomon, Aubrey. The Fox Film Corporation, 1915-1935: A History and Filmography. McFarland, 2011.

External links
 

1918 films
1918 drama films
1910s English-language films
American silent feature films
Silent American drama films
American black-and-white films
Films directed by Richard Stanton
Fox Film films
1910s American films